The Illinois Open Championship is a golf tournament that is administered by the Illinois PGA (Professional Golfers' Association). The state championship of golf is a 54-hole championship over three days to determine the finest player in the state of Illinois. The tournament is open to professionals and amateurs with a handicap of 10 or less who reside within the state of Illinois. 

In 2015, for the first time in the history of the Illinois Open, the Illinois PGA changed the format of the event having it contested at two facilities for the first and second rounds.

The final championship field size after qualifying events increased from 156 to 258 players.  The number of competitors making the cut also increased to the top 70 and ties from the top 50 and ties. Qualifying events conducted throughout the month of June finalize the championship field to the top 258 players.

Winners

a = Amateur
 PO  = Won in playoff
* = Championship was 36-holes
** = Championship was shortened to 36-holes after the second round was canceled due to weather
*** = Championship was played as a par 69 instead of 71 due to flooding. The par 5, 17th hole was played as a 158-yard, par 3.

Early history
The modern incarnation of the Illinois Open dates back to 1950. However, records show Jock Hutchison winning the 1920 Illinois Open, Leo Diegel winning in 1924 and "Lighthorse" Harry Cooper winning in 1933, 1934 and 1935.

External links
 

Golf in Illinois
PGA of America sectional tournaments
State Open golf tournaments
Recurring sporting events established in 1950